P34 or P-34 may refer to:

Vessels 
 , a frigate of the Argentine Navy
 , a submarine of the Royal Navy
 , a corvette of the Indian Navy

Other uses 
 Chuwabu language
 Cyclin-dependent kinase 1
 Papyrus 34, a biblical manuscript
 Phosphorus-34, an isotope of phosphorus
 Tyrrell P34, a Formula One race car
 Wedell-Williams XP-34, a cancelled American fighter aircraft
 P34, a state regional road in Latvia